Formica montana is an ant in the genus Formica (wood ants, mound ants, and field ants) in the family Formicidae. A common name for F. montana is "prairie mound ant".

F. montana are often polygynous, a single colony can have as many as 20 queens present.

References

Further reading
 

montana
Insects described in 1910